Lakeview is an unincorporated community in Franklin County, Texas, United States. According to the Handbook of Texas, the community had a population of 30 in 2000.

History
Lakeview had two churches in the 1930s. There were several scattered houses in 1985. Its population was 30 in 2000.

Geography

Education
In 1896, Lakeview had a school with one teacher and 35 White students. It remained in the 1930s. Today, the community is served by the Mount Vernon Independent School District.

References

Unincorporated communities in Franklin County, Texas
Unincorporated communities in Texas